The cast of the television series MythBusters perform experiments to verify or debunk urban legends, old wives' tales, and the like. This is a list of the various myths tested on the show as well as the results of the experiments (the myth is Busted, Plausible, or Confirmed).

On February 28, 2012, Discovery Channel announced that the 2012 season would commence airing on March 25, 2012. The season aired in a Sunday time slot, instead of its previous Wednesday time slot.

Cannonball accident

On December 6, 2011, while taping for the "Cannonball Chemistry" story, a home-made cannon test sent a cannonball through a residential neighborhood in Dublin, California. No one was injured, but the cannonball did considerable property damage, crashing through the walls of a family's house and landing in a car.

Episode overview

Episode 179 – "Duct Tape Island"
 Original air date: March 25, 2012
The Build Team does not appear in this episode.

Duct Tape Island Survival
Marooned on a tropical island (Oahu, Hawaii) with only a pallet of duct tape, Adam and Jamie had to use it to perform the tasks needed for survival. Their goals were to...

Episode 180 – "Fire vs. Ice"
 Original air date: April 1, 2012

Fire vs. Ice

Dust Devil

Episode 181 – "Square Wheels"
 Original air date: April 8, 2012

Square Wheels

Date Night Car
Inspired by a scene in the film Date Night, in which a taxicab and sports sedan stuck together by their front bumpers perform a series of maneuvers in city streets. The Build Team obtained two cars similar to those used in the scene, tore off their front bumpers, and built a hitch to hold them together nose-to-nose.

Episode 182 – "Swinging Pirates"
 Original air date: April 15, 2012

Pirate Swing
Adam and Jamie attempted to re-create a scene in the film Pirates of the Caribbean: Dead Man's Chest. They set out to determine whether a group of six people in a suspended spherical cage could...

Ballistics Barrel

Episode 183 – "Battle of the Sexes"
 Original air date: April 22, 2012

Adam, Jamie, and the Build Team explored five myths concerning the superiority of one gender or the other in various activities. For each myth, they chose 10 men and 10 women.

Episode 184 – "Driving in Heels"
 Original air date: April 29, 2012

Driving Dangerously

Super Adhesive Heroics

Episode 185 – "Revenge of the Myth"
 Original air date: May 6, 2012

Adam, Jamie, and the Build Team explore four previously tested myths, using viewer suggestions for improvement or new tests.

Revenge of the Water Cannon

Fireworks Man 2

Bird Balance Limo

Excavator Viral Challenge
A challenge from viewers to try new feats using excavators, based on "Excavator Exuberance" from 2011. Adam and Jamie attempted to...

Episode 186 – "Bouncing Bullet"
 Original air date: May 13, 2012

Bouncing Bullets

Shock Wave Surf

Episode SP18 – "Mailbag Special"
 Original air date: May 20, 2012
The Build Team answers a series of randomly chosen letters sent in by viewers, answering questions and doing a series of short tests.

Questions and Comments

Myths and Tests

Episode 187 – "Bubble Pack Plunge"
 Original air date: June 3, 2012

Bubble Boy

Bond Car Flip

Episode 188 – "Duel Dilemmas"
 Original air date: June 10, 2012

Duel Dilemma

Fire Dragon

Episode 189 – "Hollywood Gunslingers"
 Original air date: June 17, 2012

Adam, Jamie, Tory, Kari and Grant explored eight firearm-related movie scenarios.

Unlimited Ammo

Hollywood Stances

MAC-10 vs. Stairs

Nailgun Gun

Action vs. Reaction

Weird Bullets

Hero Never Hit

What Is Bulletproof?

Episode SP19 – "Jawsome Shark Special"
 Original air date: August 13, 2012

To celebrate the 25th anniversary of Shark Week on the Discovery Channel, Adam and Jamie counted down their 25 favorite shark-related myths, including some that had not previously aired.

Episode 190 – "Titanic Survival"
 Original air date: October 7, 2012

A Titanic Tale

Rocket Surfer

Episode 191 – "Trench Torpedo"
 Original air date: October 14, 2012

Trench Torpedo

Party Balloon Pile-Up

Episode 192 – "Hail Hijinx"
 Original US air date: October 21, 2012
 Original Australia air date: September 3, 2012
This episode was also called "Cliffhanger Bridge Boom" in Australia.

Cliffhanger Bridge Boom

Hail Hijinks

Episode 193 – "Fright Night"
 Original air date: October 28, 2012

The Haunted Hum

The Smell of Fear

Dead Body Disposal
Adam and Jamie investigated two myths based on movie scenes involving the transportation and burial of dead bodies.

Episode 194 – "Mini Myth Medley"
 Original air date: November 4, 2012

Adam, Jamie, and the Build Team tested five myths chosen at random from viewer submissions.

Monk Magic

Underwater Bike Ride

Fireman Finger

Episode 195 – "Cannonball Chemistry"

 Original air date: November 11, 2012

Mattress Mayhem

Cannonball Chemistry

At the start of the episode, the Build Team apologized for the cannonball accident that occurred while they were testing this myth.

Episode 196 – "Food Fables"
 Original air date: November 18, 2012

Car Cook-Off
For their myths, Jamie and Adam were joined by celebrity chef Alton Brown, who is an enthusiast of incorporating science into cooking and had previously busted food myths on an episode of Good Eats reverentially titled Myth Smashers.

Tryptophan Turkey

Tastes Like Chicken

Instant Popcorn

Dishwasher Lasagna

Episode SP20 – "Explosions A to Z"
 Original US air date: November 25, 2012
 Original Australian air date: September 24, 2012
This episode was called "The A to Z of Explosions" in Australia.

The Build Team presents a series of 25 vignettes, one for each letter of the alphabet (except X and Y, which they combined), concerning the explosions that have been carried out in myth testing.

References

General references

External links

 
 

2012
2012 American television seasons